The Santos Dumont Collection, also known as Alberto Santos Dumont Collection, is a collection of about 1,500 items linked to Santos Dumont, under the guard of the Museu Paulista. The collection includes several types of material, including texts, objects and iconographies of the Brazilian inventor, in particular 323 images about the aeronautical trajectory of Santos Dumont. The collection was donated by the family after the inventor's death in 1932.

Temporary Collection Cession
In mid-2005 the Museu Paulista temporarily ceded part of the Santos Dumont collection to the Musée de l'air et de l'espace, in France. At the time, the French museum organized an exhibition entitled "I Navigated through the Air", composed of objects, textual and iconographic documents of Santos Dumont. The Museu Paulista sent 178 of the 1,600 items in the collection to Paris.

References

Collections
Alberto Santos-Dumont